Eugene Burns was an American author and war correspondent (b. Eugene Burnstein in Estonia). He died on July 15, 1958, at the age of 52, during a street mob revolt in Baghdad, Iraq.

Personal
Burns was born in Moscow. Before working in Iraq, Burns lived in Sausalito, California. Burns was married to Olga Burns. They had twin daughters, Carol Eugenia Burns and Stephanie Olga Burns, born in 1944.

Career
He started out his career as a newsman and later worked as a correspondent for the Associated Press in the Soviet Union, China, and Pacific during World War II. He also wrote books on animals and fishing, and was the author of the column, "Is That So?", which covered wildlife.

Bibliography
The Last King of Paradise (Pellegrini and Cudahy, 1952)
Then There Was One: The U.S.S. Enterprise and the first year of war (1944)

References

1957 deaths
Year of birth missing
People from Sausalito, California